Tanymecus indicus is a species of weevil. It is a pest of millets such as pearl millet and sorghum in India.

References

Entiminae
Insect pests of millets